Fredrik Wilhelm Bugge (7 July 1893 – 30 July 1972) was a Norwegian barrister and businessperson.

Personal life
He was born in Kristiania as a son of barrister Fredrik Moltke Bugge (1865–1938) and Kristine Elisabeth Heuch. He was a grandson of bishop Frederik Wilhelm Klumpp Bugge, great-grandson of educator Frederik Moltke Bugge, great-great-grandson of bishop Peter Olivarius Bugge and great-grandnephew of Søren Bruun Bugge. On the maternal side he was a grandson of bishop Johan Christian Heuch.

In 1922 he married barrister's daughter Gudrun Gundersen. They had the sons Frederik Moltke Bugge, barrister, and Jens Bugge, Supreme Court Justice.

Career
After finishing his secondary education in 1911, he graduated from the Royal Frederick University with the cand.jur. degree in 1915. He was a deputy judge in Lillehammer and Fredrikstad from 1916 to 1917, junior solicitor from 1917 to 1922, and barrister with access to Supreme Court cases from 1922. From 1923 he was a law firm partner with barrister Herman Christiansen.

He was a board member of Sauda Smelteverk from 1920, Meråker Smelteverk from 1928, Høyanger Aluminiumsverk and Nordisk Aluminiumsindustri, Holmestrand from 1939, Norsk Elektrisk & Brown Boveri from 1941, Det Norske Nitrid from 1947, Den norske Creditbank and Forsikringsselskapet Norden. He was a supervisory council member of Arendal Smelteverk, Det Norske Garantiselskap, Borregaard and Morgenbladet. He died in July 1972.

References

1893 births
1972 deaths
Lawyers from Oslo
University of Oslo alumni
20th-century Norwegian lawyers
20th-century Norwegian businesspeople